Charles or Charlie White (or occasionally Whyte) may refer to:

Artists and authors
 Charles White (artist) (1918–1979), African-American painter, printmaker, muralist
 Charles White (writer) (1845–1922), Australian journalist and author
 Charlie White (artist) (born 1972), American photographer

Politics
 Charles Frederick White (1863–1923), British MP for West Derbyshire, 1918–1923
 Charles Frederick White (politician, born 1891) (1891–1956), British MP for West Derbyshire, 1944–1950
 Charles A. White (1882–1925), American organized labor lobbyist, Illinois state representative
 Charles William White (1838–1890), Member of Parliament for Tipperary, 1866–1875
 Charles P. White (born 1970), Former Indiana Secretary of State, 2011–2012
 Charles White (New Zealand politician) (1880–1966), New Zealand lawyer, member of the New Zealand Legislative Council

Sports
 Charles White (American football) (1958–2023), American football player, Heisman Trophy winner
 Charles "Tom" White (athlete) (1917–1985), English runner
 Charlie White (footballer) (1889–1925), English football player for Watford
 Charlie White (figure skater) (born 1987), American ice dancer
 Charles White (cricketer) (1823–1873), cricketer
 Charlie White (rugby union) (1874–1941), Australian rugby union player
 Charlie White (baseball) (1927–1998), Major League Baseball catcher

Others
 Charles White (Dr Rock) (born 1942), Irish-born BBC Radio and television presenter
 Charles White (physician) (1728–1813), English surgeon and man-midwife, co-founder of the Manchester Royal Infirmary
 Charles Abiathar White (1826–1910), American geologist, paleontologist, and writer
 Charles M. White (1891–1977), American steel industrialist
 Charles Daniel White (1879–1955), American prelate of the Roman Catholic Church
 Charles Ignatius White (1807–1878), American editor, historian, and Catholic priest
 Charles White (chef) (born 1976), American trained chef and author
 Charles "Charlie" White (1815–1900), minstrel performer and theater manager
 Chuck White, a fictional character in American Dad!
 Sir C. A. White (Charles Arnold White, 1858–1931), Indian lawyer and judge
 Charles E. White Jr. (1876–1936), Chicago area architect
 Charles Lincoln White (1863–1941), President of Colby College, Maine
 Charles Whyte (1866–1949), Scottish astronomer
 Cr1TiKaL (Charles White, born 1994), American YouTuber and Twitch streamer